Leucadendron sessile, the western sunbush, is a flower-bearing shrub belonging to the genus Leucadendron and forms part of the fynbos. The plant is native to the Western Cape, South Africa.

Description

Fire destroys the plant but the seeds survive. The seeds are stored in a toll on the female plant and are released after two months when they are ripe and fall to the ground. Rodents disperse the seeds. The plant is unisexual and there are male and female plants. Small towers do the pollination.

Distribution with habitat
The plant occurs in the Witsenberg, Elandskloof to Slanghoek Mountains, Hottentots Holland Mountains from Jonkershoek to Kogelberg.

Gallery

References

Threatened Species Programme | SANBI Red List of South African Plants
Leucadendron sessile R.Br.
Leucadendron sessile (Western sunbush)
Sun Conebush

sessile